The John Crerar Library  is a research library, which after a long history of independent operations, is now operated by the University of Chicago. Throughout its history, the library's technology resources have made it popular with Chicago-area business and industry. Though privately owned and operated, the library continues to provide free access to the public for the purpose of conducting research in science, medicine and technology.

Established in 1894, the library which first opened to the public April 1, 1897, is named for John Crerar, who endowed the library, and who gained his wealth by founding a railroad supply firm.

History
John Crerar died in 1889. His will gave approximately $2.6 million of his estate to Chicago as an endowment for a free public library, selected "to create and sustain a healthy moral and Christian sentiment, and that all nastiness and immorality be excluded." To comply with Crerar's wishes without duplicating existing area libraries, the directors decided to limit the collections to the sciences, including the history of science. In 1906, the directors expanded the library's mission to include medicine. Since 1951, the collection has focused on current science, technology, and medicine.

In 1891, Crerar's friends lobbied the Illinois state legislature to enact a law to protect privately funded libraries, entitled, "An Act to Encourage and Promote the Establishment of Free Public Libraries in Cities, Villages and Towns of this State." On October 12, 1894, the library was incorporated under that law. However, Crerar's relatives contested his will and then appealed issue to the Illinois Supreme Court. On  June 19, 1893, the will was sustained.

The Crerar Library opened in the Marshall Field building, moving in 1921 to its own building at the northwest corner of Randolph Street and Michigan Avenue. The Board of Directors of the library established a building fund with the 1889 endowment and set out to gain approval for a Grant Park location. In 1902, the Chicago City Council approved the plan, but public criticism forced the design to be built on the Northwest corner of Michigan Avenue. World War I postponed groundbreaking of the 16-story Holabird & Roche design until 1919. When the building reached its capacity in the 1950s, the library's directors decided to affiliate with a university. The directors contracted with the Illinois Institute of Technology to provide library services for its campus. In 1962, the library moved into a new building that was designed by architect Walter Netsch. It was a  facility with an international modern design inspired by Mies van der Rohe.  During its 22 years located on the IIT campus, the John Crerar Library remained a separate organization, with IIT reimbursing the costs attributable to it. By the mid-1970s, however, the library had out-grown that building, and in 1980 Crerar and IIT agreed to terminate the contract within four years. On April 13, 1981, the directors agreed to consolidate the collection with the University of Chicago's science collection in a new building, which opened on September 10, 1984. Because the library was incorporated under the 1891 special law, court approval was required for the merger. A condition of the merger was that the combined library would also remain free to the public. The merger, with a combined collection of 900,000 volumes, was among the largest in American library history.

Following World War II, the John Crerar Library became one of the first to offer a fee-based research service which was targeted to industry and government users.  In 1952, it became one of the first libraries in the nation to install a Teletype machine. The library now offers computer-based searches of a wide variety of scientific and medical data bases. Since the 1950s, the library offers corporate memberships to both for-profit and non-profit organizations that now includes borrowing privileges and access to the University of Chicago Libraries as well as to Crerar. Also, from 1968 to 1979, the National Library of Medicine funded the library to serve as its Midwest Regional Medical Library.

Current library

The merger set aside $300,000 to form a separate John Crerar Foundation. The Foundation now also sponsors the John Crerar Foundation Science Writing Prize for College students.

The official motto of the John Crerar Library is engraved on its current building: Non est mortuus qui scientiam vivificavit (translation:  "He has not died who has given life to knowledge")

The Crerar collection includes 27,000 rare books including works by Copernicus, Leonardo da Vinci, Descartes, Franklin, and Newton.

References

External links

John Crerar Library Photographs  at the Newberry Library
Guide to the University of Chicago Library. John Crerar Library. Records 1977-2009 at the University of Chicago Special Collections Research Center

Libraries in Chicago
University and college academic libraries in the United States
University of Chicago Library
Embedded educational institutions
Library buildings completed in 1984